Hwange National Park Airport  is an airport in Zimbabwe that serves the Hwange National Park. Because of the ongoing economic situation in Zimbabwe, and the 2012 collapse of Air Zimbabwe, services are limited.

Air Zimbabwe formerly included Hwange National Park on its daily internal service of Harare - Victoria Falls - Hwange - Kariba - Harare.

See also
Transport in Zimbabwe
List of airports in Zimbabwe
List of longest runways

References

External links
World Aero Data - Hwange National Park
OurAirports - Hwange Park

Hwange
Airports in Zimbabwe
Buildings and structures in Matabeleland North Province